Werner Schlichting (1904–1996) was a German art director who worked on over a hundred films during a lengthy career. He worked on a number of Austrian films including The Congress Dances and The Last Ten Days (1955).

Selected filmography
 Luther (1928)
 The Flame of Love (1930)
 Calais-Dover (1931)
 No More Love (1931)
 Two Hearts Beat as One (1932)
 The Song of Night (1932)
 How Shall I Tell My Husband? (1932)
 All for Love (1933)
 What Men Know (1933)
 A Song for You (1933)
 My Heart Calls You (1934)
 So Ended a Great Love (1934)
 My Heart Is Calling You (1934)
 Victoria (1935)
 Artist Love (1935)
 Casta Diva (1935)
 The Emperor's Candlesticks (1936)
 Court Theatre (1936)
 Serenade (1937)
 Capers (1937)
 A Mother's Love (1939)
 Bel Ami (1939)
 Destiny (1942)
 The Secret Countess (1942)
 Late Love (1943)
 Archduke Johann's Great Love (1950)
 Bonus on Death (1950)
 Maria Theresa (1951)
 Heidi (1952)
 Fireworks (1954)
 Walking Back into the Past (1954)
 Cabaret (1954)
 The Congress Dances (1955)
 The Last Ten Days (1955)
 Mozart (1955)
 Crown Prince Rudolph's Last Love (1956)
 The Saint and Her Fool (1957)
 The Priest and the Girl (1958)
 Arena of Fear (1959)
 Jacqueline (1959)
 Via Mala (1961)
 Long Legs, Long Fingers (1966)
 Morning's at Seven (1968)
 When Sweet Moonlight Is Sleeping in the Hills (1969)

References

Bibliography
 Fritsche, Maria. Homemade Men in Postwar Austrian Cinema: Nationhood, Genre and Masculinity. Berghahn Books, 2013.

External links

1904 births
1996 deaths
German art directors
Film people from Berlin